Thomas Wheatley (1821–1883) was an English mechanical engineer who worked for several British railway companies and rose to become a Locomotive Superintendent at the London and North Western Railway (LNWR) and the North British Railway (NBR).

Career
He became an apprentice with the Leeds and Selby Railway and later worked for the Midland Railway and the Manchester, Sheffield and Lincolnshire Railway.  Subsequently, he was Locomotive Superintendent for the Southern Division of the London and North Western Railway for 5 years.  From 1867 to 1874 he was Locomotive Superintendent of the North British Railway (NBR).  Prior to 1867 the post had been split across divisions.

Locomotives
Under Wheatley's superintendency, 185 new locomotives were added to NBR stock, and a number of old engines were rebuilt for further service. Only eight of the new locomotives were intended for express passenger trains. Locomotives designed by Thomas Wheatley included:

See also
 Locomotives of the North British Railway

Notes

References

1821 births
1883 deaths
Locomotive builders and designers
English railway mechanical engineers